Mujaahid Maynard (born April 9, 1971) is an American wrestler. He competed in the men's Greco-Roman 48 kg at the 1996 Summer Olympics.

References

1971 births
Living people
American male sport wrestlers
Olympic wrestlers of the United States
Wrestlers at the 1996 Summer Olympics
Sportspeople from Brooklyn
Pan American Games medalists in wrestling
Pan American Games gold medalists for the United States
Wrestlers at the 1995 Pan American Games
20th-century American people
21st-century American people